Cyathodonta is a genus of bivalve mollusc in the family Thraciidae.

Species
 Cyathodonta cruziana Dall, 1915
 Cyathodonta dubiosa Dall, 1915
 Cyathodonta granulosa (Adams & Reeve, 1850)
 Cyathodonta pedroana Dall, 1915
 Cyathodonta plicata (Deshayes, 1832)
 Cyathodonta rugosa (Lamarck, 1818)
 Cyathodonta tumbeziana Olsson, 1961
 Cyathodonta undulata Conrad, 1849
Species brought into synonymy
 Cyathodonta galapagana Dall, 1915: synonym of Bushia galapagana (Dall, 1915)
 Cyathodonta lucasana Dall, 1915: synonym of Cyathodonta undulata Conrad, 1849
 Cyathodonta rectangulata Macsotay, 1968: synonym of Cyathodonta rugosa (Lamarck, 1818)

References

  Coan, E. V.; Valentich-Scott, P. (2012). Bivalve seashells of tropical West America. Marine bivalve mollusks from Baja California to northern Peru. 2 vols, 1258 pp.

Thraciidae
Bivalve genera